A Public Reading of an Unproduced Screenplay About the Death of Walt Disney is a 2013 play by Lucas Hnath.

Synopsis 
The show is in the form of a screenplay written and performed by Walt Disney about himself and his death. It's about his last days on earth and a city he's going to build that's going to change the world.

Production History 
The play premiered at the Soho Rep in 2013. It was directed by Sarah Benson.

The Wilbury Theatre Group produced the New England premiere of the play in November 2014. The production was directed by Brien Lang.

The play was produced by MKA Theatre in Australia in 2018. The production was directed by Tobias Manderson-Galvin and starred a real life family.

References 

2013 plays
American plays
Works about Walt Disney
